The Greater St. Paul AME Church is a historic African Methodist Episcopal church at 215 W. 3rd Street in San Angelo, Texas, United States.  It was built in 1927 and added to the National Register in 1988.

Its congregation was organized in 1883.

See also

National Register of Historic Places listings in Tom Green County, Texas

References

African Methodist Episcopal churches in Texas
Churches on the National Register of Historic Places in Texas
Churches in Tom Green County, Texas
Buildings and structures in San Angelo, Texas
National Register of Historic Places in Tom Green County, Texas